The 1964 AFC Youth Championship was held in Saigon, South Vietnam.

Teams
The following teams entered the tournament:

 
 
 
 
 
 
 
  (host)

Group stage

Group A

Results:

Group B

Results:

Third place match

Final

External links
Results by RSSSF

AFC U-19 Championship
1964 in Vietnam
1964 in Asian football
International association football competitions hosted by Vietnam
1964 in youth association football